Helicops tapajonicus is a species of snake in the family Colubridae. It is found in Brazil.

References 

Helicops
Snakes of South America
Reptiles of Brazil
Endemic fauna of Brazil
Reptiles described in 2005